Shrek: Ogres & Dronkeys is a virtual life Nintendo DS video game developed by WayForward Technologies and published by Activision on November 5, 2007.

Gameplay
Players train, play and explore with characters and environments from the Shrek series.

Critical reception
The game has a Metacritic rating of 54% based on 4 critic reviews.

Game Chronicles said "Shrek: Ogres and Dronkeys is not necessarily a terrible game, it is more that it just does nothing to stand out from the crowd of pet simulators that are already saturating the market." Gamezone said "Once all the items are round, there isn’t any point to replay the levels. Parents may want to pass on this one." PocketGamerUK said "While it doesn't quite measure up to the best of the virtual pet breed, Shrek: Ogres and Dronkeys is an almost satisfying game that younger Shrek fans will enjoy." CheatCodeCentral said "While it does have a few redeeming qualities, Shrek: Ogres and Dronkeys is brought down by its unimaginative and poorly executed gameplay mechanic. There's no real plot either, which is a shame." IGN gave it a rating of 7.0 out of 10.

References

Shrek video games
Nintendo DS games
Nintendo DS-only games
2007 video games
Activision games
Single-player video games
WayForward games
Video games developed in the United States